John Edward Currie (18 March 1921 – 21 April 1984) was an English footballer who played for Bournemouth and Boscombe Athletic, Stafford Rangers, and Port Vale shortly after World War II.

Career
Currie scored two goals in eight Third Division South games for Harry Kinghorn's Bournemouth and Boscombe Athletic in the 1946–47 season. He also enjoyed a loan spell with Stafford Rangers, before switching permanently from Dean Court to Staffordshire based Port Vale in June 1947. He only managed nine Third Division South appearances in the 1947–48 season and was released from The Old Recreation Ground in the summer by manager Gordon Hodgson.

Career statistics
Source:

References

1921 births
1984 deaths
Footballers from Liverpool
English footballers
Association football wingers
AFC Bournemouth players
Stafford Rangers F.C. players
Port Vale F.C. players
English Football League players